Basile Petros IV Avkadian (in Armenian Բարսեղ Պետրոս Դ. Աւգատեան ) was an Armenian Catholic Patriarch from Aleppo, Syria from 1780 until 1788. He started as part of the St. Antonin Order. He served the three previous Armenian Catholic patriarchs Abraham Petros I Ardzivian, Jacob Petros II Hovsepian and Michael Petros III Kasparian for forty years before being elected patriarch in 1780. It was said of him that "[H]e never took off his monachal garment when he was bishop and Catholicos".

See also
 List of Armenian Catholic Patriarchs of Cilicia

References

External links
Biography on official site of the Armenian Catholic Church

Armenian Catholic Patriarchs of Cilicia
People from Aleppo
Syrian people of Armenian descent
Syrian Eastern Catholics
Year of birth uncertain
Year of death unknown
18th-century Eastern Catholic archbishops
18th-century people from the Ottoman Empire
Bishops in the Ottoman Empire